This is a list of notable barbecue restaurants. Barbecue is a method and apparatus for char grilling food in the hot smoke of a wood fire, usually charcoal fueled. In the United States, to grill is to cook in this manner quickly, while barbecue is typically a much slower method utilizing less heat than grilling, attended to over an extended period of several hours. The term as a noun can refer to the meat, the cooking apparatus itself (the "barbecue grill" or simply "barbecue") or to the party that includes such food or such preparation methods. The term as an adjective can refer to foods cooked by this method. The term is also used as a verb for the act of cooking food in this manner. Barbecue has numerous regional variations in many parts of the world.

Barbecue restaurants

 Al Tazaj
 Andy Nelson's Southern Pit Barbecue
 Arthur Bryant's
 B.T.'s Smokehouse
 Bill Miller Bar-B-Q Enterprises
 Billy Sims BBQ
 Blue Ribbon Barbecue
 The Blues Kitchen
 Chicken Treat
 City Barbeque
 Chooks Fresh & Tasty
 Cooper's Old Time Pit Bar-B-Que
 Dickey's Barbecue Pit
 Dinosaur Bar-B-Que
 Dixie's BBQ
 Dreamland Bar-B-Que
 Famous Dave's
 Fiorella's Jack Stack Barbecue
 Fogo de Chão
 Franklin Barbecue
 Gates Bar-B-Q
 Gator's Dockside
 Gyu-Kaku
 Holy Trinity Barbecue, Portland, Oregon
 Joe’s Kansas City Bar-B-Que
 Jones Bar-B-Q Diner
 Jones Bar-B-Q
 L&L Hawaiian Barbecue
 Lem's Bar-B-Q
 Louie Mueller Barbecue
 Lucille's Smokehouse BBQ
 Matt's BBQ, Oregon
 Mission BBQ
 Montgomery Inn
 Nando's
 Pappas Restaurants
 Pappy's Smokehouse
 Phil's BBQ
 Podnah's Pit Barbecue, Portland, Oregon
 Red Hot & Blue
 Reo's Ribs, Portland, Oregon, U.S.
 Rib Crib
 Rudy's Country Store and Bar-B-Q
 The Salt Lick
 Sconyers Bar-B-Que
 Scores
 Shane's Rib Shack
 Slow's Bar BQ
 Smithfield's Chicken 'N Bar-B-Q
 Smokey Bones
 Snow's BBQ
 Sonny Bryan's Smokehouse
 Sonny's BBQ
 Texas de Brazil
 Tony Roma's
 Vera's Backyard Bar-B-Que
  Weber Grill Restaurants

See also
 List of seafood restaurants
 Lists of restaurants

 
Barbecue